The 2021–22 Bangladesh Premier League, also known as TVS Bangladesh Premier League for sponsorship reasons, was the 14th season of the Bangladesh Premier League since its establishment in 2007. A total of 12 football clubs competed  in the league. The country's top-flight football competition was started from 3 February 2022.

Bashundhara Kings were the champions as 2021 season winner.

Teams

Changes

Stadiums and locations

Personnel and kits

Head coaching changes

Foreign players

Bold names refer to international players who have already played or are still playing.
Note :: players who released during summer transfer window;: players who registered during summer transfer window.

League table

Results

Positions by round
The following table lists the positions of teams after each week of matches. In order to preserve the chronological evolution, any postponed matches are not included to the round at which they were originally scheduled but added to the full round they were played immediately afterward.

Season statistics

Goalscorers

Own goals 
† Bold Club indicates winner of the match

Hat-tricks

Most Assists

Most Penalties Scored

Clean Sheets

Discipline

Player 

 Most yellow cards: 7
 Ayzar Akmatov (Sheikh Russel KC)
 Sajon Mia (Muktijoddha Sangsad KC)
 Shakil Hossain (Swadhinata KS)
 Tareq Miah (Muktijoddha Sangsad KC) 

 Most red cards: 2
 Masud Rana (Mohammedan SC)
 Otabek Valijonov (Sheikh Jamal DC)

Club 

 Yellow cards:

 Red cards:

See also
2021–22 Bangladesh Championship League
2021–22 Federation Cup
2021–22 Independence Cup
2021–22 BFF U-18 Football League
 2021-22 BFF U-16 Football Tournament

References

Bangladesh Football Premier League seasons
2021–22 in Asian association football leagues
2021 in Bangladeshi football
2022 in Bangladeshi football